In Inca mythology, Vichaama is the god of death and the son of Inti. His mother was murdered by his half-brother Pacha Kamaq, and he took revenge by turning the humans who were created by Pachacamac into rocks and islands. Afterwards he hatched three eggs from which a new race of humans was born.

The name has been adopted by a theatre group from Villa El Salvador, Lima, Peru, which works worldwide, raising issues involving social responsibility and involvement.

External links
 Official information site (in blog form) of Vichama theatre group

Inca gods
Death gods
Organisations based in Peru